Alayamon  is a village in Kollam district in the state of Kerala, India.

Demographics
 India census, Alayamon had a population of 12869 with 6226 males and 6643 females.

References

Villages in Kollam district